Melissa Lynne McFerrin (born December 20, 1960) is an American retired college basketball coach, having most recently served as head coach of the Memphis Tigers women's basketball team.  McFerrin played point guard in college basketball at the University of Missouri from 1979–1983, reaching the Sweet 16 in 1982. She announced her retirement from coaching in February of 2021.

Early years
McFerrin grew up in Cassville, Missouri, and participated on the track team in high school, competing in the high jump where she placed first in class A in 1978.

College 
McFerrin attended the University of Missouri between 1979–83, earning a letter in basketball each of her four years  as the starting point guard for the Tigers. She help the team to the Big Eight title in 1983 and two NCAA tournament appearances in 1982 and 1983. In her senior year, she was honored as the Big Eight Scholar Athlete, graduating with a bachelor's degree in secondary education. In 1983 she earned all big eight honorable mention in 1983.

Coaching 
After college, she started her coaching career as a graduate assistant at Wayland Baptist. After a single season at Wayland Baptist, she spent six years as an assistant at Central Michigan. While at Central Michigan she earned a master's degree in physical education in 1988. McFerrin then moved on to Ohio State where she served as an assistant for seven years. During her time at Ohio State the team won the Big Ten in 1993, and finished as national runner-up in the NCAA tournament. She served as the recruiting coordinator during her tenure at Ohio State. The 1992 recruiting class was ranked as the number one recruiting class in the nation, in no small part to the fact that it included Katie Smith in the class.

In 1997, McFerrin moved to the professional ranks, joining the New York Liberty as an assistant coach. In her  three years at the Liberty the team finished as runner-up twice, losing to Houston in the finals in 1997 and 1999. She then moved on to the Washington Mystics where she stayed for three years, two of which as the general manager. In her first season as general manager. the Mystics made the WNBA playoffs for the first time ever.

In 2002, McFerrin returned to the college coaching ranks, initially as an assistant coach for the University of Minnesota, and then as an associate head coach for the same team.

In 2004, McFerrin took on her first head coaching position accepting the position at American University. She remained at American for four seasons. In her final year at American, the American Eagle she finished first in the Patriot League and earned an invitation to the WNIT tournament. She was named Patriot League Coach of the year.

McFerrin became the head coach at the University of Memphis in 2008. After an initial losing season, the team put together four consecutive winning seasons and four consecutive postseason invitations, making the finals of the WBI in 2010 and earning invitations to the WNIT in the next three years. In 2013 Memphis became part of the American Athletic Conference. The team has one postseason appearance in the four years since joining the American conference, a WNIT invitation in 2016.

Head coaching record

References

External links
 Coach Melissa McFerrin official web site
 Melissa McFerrin bio at the University of Memphis athletics web site
 Melissa McFerrin bio at the American University athletics web site

1960 births
Living people
American Eagles women's basketball coaches
American women's basketball coaches
Basketball coaches from Missouri
Memphis Tigers women's basketball coaches
Minnesota Golden Gophers women's basketball coaches
Missouri Tigers women's basketball players
New York Liberty coaches
Ohio State Buckeyes women's basketball coaches
People from Cassville, Missouri
Washington Mystics coaches
Women's National Basketball Association general managers